Omanjor is an area in the Ga West Constituency of Ghana, the town was previously known as Atikpoe. 
Omanjor is under the Trobu Constituency with Hon. Moses Anim as the MP. Omannjor is boarded to Sowutuom in the West and Fanmilk in the East. Asofa to the North and Anyaa to the South.
Omanjor is a mountainside with huge gulleys, erosion ridden valleys and tarred road. It's a small town and its linked to Dwenewoho.

Populated places in Ghana